Kawakawa is a small town in the Bay of Islands area of the Northland Region of New Zealand. Kawakawa developed as a service town when coal was found there in the 1860s, but coal mining ceased in the early 20th century. The economy is now based on farming. The town is named after the kawakawa shrub.

History and culture

Kawakawa starting developing as a town with the mining of coal, which was discovered there in March 1864. A horse-drawn tramway was opened in 1868 to carry coal from the mines to the Taumarere wharf. In 1871 two steam locomotives were acquired and the tramway was upgraded to railway standard. In 1884 a railway line from Kawakawa to Opua was opened, and this replaced the line to Taumarere wharf. The area was a location for the late 19th/early 20th century kauri gum digging trade.

By 1899 there were about 1,000 residents in the town, which was built mainly on the hillside. In 1899 a fire destroyed all but a few of the buildings. The town was rebuilt on the flat, alongside the railway tracks. The present railway station was built in 1911.

A railway line south to Whangarei was completed in 1911. Coal mining ceased at Kawakawa in the early 20th century.

The Bay of Islands County headquarters were in Kawakawa until the county was disestablished in 1989.

Marae
Kawakawa has four marae affiliated with hapū of Ngāpuhi, all based approximately 5km south of the township in Waiomio. Mohinui Marae and its Hohourongo meeting house are affiliated with Ngāti Hine and Ngāti Kahu o Torongare. Kawiti Marae and Te Tawai Riri Maihi Kawiti meeting house, Miria Marae and Te Rapunga meeting house and Te Kotahitanga and its meeting house of the same name are also connected to Ngāti Hine.

In October 2020, the Government committed $297,133 from the Provincial Growth Fund to upgrade Mohinui Marae, creating 3 jobs. It also committed $168,084 to upgrade Miria Marae, creating 14 jobs.

Demographics

Kawakawa had a population of 1,464 at the 2018 New Zealand census, an increase of 249 people (20.5%) since the 2013 census, and an increase of 138 people (10.4%) since the 2006 census. There were 426 households, comprising 732 males and 732 females, giving a sex ratio of 1.0 males per female. The median age was 31.7 years (compared with 37.4 years nationally), with 405 people (27.7%) aged under 15 years, 297 (20.3%) aged 15 to 29, 606 (41.4%) aged 30 to 64, and 156 (10.7%) aged 65 or older.

Ethnicities were 41.6% European/Pākehā, 73.8% Māori, 8.2% Pacific peoples, 4.5% Asian, and 1.0% other ethnicities. People may identify with more than one ethnicity.

The percentage of people born overseas was 9.4, compared with 27.1% nationally.

Although some people chose not to answer the census's question about religious affiliation, 43.0% had no religion, 37.1% were Christian, 9.2% had Māori religious beliefs, 1.2% were Hindu, 0.2% were Muslim, 0.6% were Buddhist and 2.7% had other religions.

Of those at least 15 years old, 123 (11.6%) people had a bachelor's or higher degree, and 231 (21.8%) people had no formal qualifications. The median income was $22,800, compared with $31,800 nationally. 69 people (6.5%) earned over $70,000 compared to 17.2% nationally. The employment status of those at least 15 was that 465 (43.9%) people were employed full-time, 156 (14.7%) were part-time, and 102 (9.6%) were unemployed.

Features

The town is known as "Train Town", because the Bay of Islands Vintage Railway runs down the middle of its main street on the former Opua Branch railway line. Eight km of the 17 km track reopened in 2008. At present trains cannot go over "Long Bridge" because rails have not been relaid since it was re-piled, and the track between this bridge at Taumarere and Opua is being used as part of the Twin Coast Cyclepath. When the rails have been relaid, the cyclepath will be moved next to the track.

The town is also famous for its Hundertwasser toilet block, designed by Austrian artist Friedensreich Hundertwasser, who was a resident of the town from 1975 until his death in 2000.

The Kawiti glowworm caves at nearby Waiomio are also an attraction.

Education 
Kawakawa Primary School is a full primary (years 1–8) school with a roll of   students.

Bay of Islands College is a secondary (years 9–13) school with a roll of   students. It takes students from around the Bay of Islands and middle Northland, with 85% of its students travelling daily by bus to attend.

Te Mirumiru Early Childhood Education Centre, adjacent to the Kawakawa Office, includes bilingual units teaching in Māori language.

Both schools are coeducational. Rolls are as of 

Karetu School is located nearby, in Karetu.

Notable people 
Kelvin Davis – politician
Jack Goodhue – rugby player
Pita Paraone – politician
Willow-Jean Prime – politician
Joe Schmidt – rugby coach

References

External links 

 Bay of Islands College

Populated places in the Northland Region
Far North District
Bay of Islands
1861 establishments in New Zealand